San Andrés Zautla  is a town and municipality in Oaxaca in south-western Mexico.

Geography
The municipality covers an area of 21.69 km². 
It is part of the Etla District in the Valles Centrales region.

As of 2005, the municipality had a total population of 3812, of whom 150 spoke an indigenous language.

History
During the colonial period San Andrés Zautla was part of the jurisdiction of Huexolotitlan. A 16th century Spanish colonial church in town is a listed Cultural Landmark, and possesses a historic pipe organ, dated 1726, now restored and playable.

References

Municipalities of Oaxaca